Omorgus indigenus is a species of hide beetle in the subfamily Omorginae.

References

indigenus
Beetles described in 1990